Izak van der Merwe was defending champion but defeated in the semifinals by Denis Kudla.
Kudla went on to win the title after defeating Alex Kuznetsov 6–0, 6–3 in the final.

Seeds

Draw

Finals

Top half

Bottom half

References
 Main Draw
 Qualifying Draw

Charlottesville Men's Pro Challenger - Singles
2012 Singles